Secret Admirer is a 1985 American teen romantic comedy film written and directed by David Greenwalt in his feature film directorial debut, and starring C. Thomas Howell, Lori Loughlin, Kelly Preston and Fred Ward. The original music score was composed by Jan Hammer. The film was produced at the height of the teen sex comedy cinema craze in the mid-1980s.

Plot 
Michael Ryan is a high school student who receives an anonymous love letter. Michael is obsessed with Deborah Ann Fimple, the class beauty, and his best friend, Roger, convinces him that the letter is from her. However, he is totally oblivious that his friend Toni Williams is in love with him. Michael writes Deborah Ann an anonymous love letter in return, and asks Toni to give it to her. Toni reads the letter and, realizing it's poorly written and unromantic (since Michael had copied words from greeting cards), she rewrites it.

Elizabeth Fimple, Deborah Ann's mother, discovers the letter. Her jealous police officer husband, Lou Fimple, sees her reading it. He steals the letter, and believes that his wife is having an affair. He suspects his neighbor (and bridge partner) George Ryan. George also reads the letter (although by mistake) because Lou's wife is his night school teacher and it somehow ends up in his book. When George asks her about it, he assumes she wants to have an affair with him, despite the fact that she is friends with his wife. Meanwhile, Lou shows the letter to George's wife, Connie, and proposes that they expose the adulterers. Receiving no response from Deborah Ann, Michael writes a second letter, which Toni again rewrites.

Michael experiences a series of wacky adventures with his friends throughout the summer before his Senior year in High School. After Toni arranges a meeting between the two, he tells Deborah Ann that he wrote the love letters, and she finally agrees to a real date, during which they are almost caught by Debbie's jock college "quasi boyfriend" Steve, but Toni intervenes by pretending to seduce him and later ditches him. After a short while Michael realizes Deb is snobby and shallow — not like he expected her to be — and begins to realize his true feelings for Toni. Eventually, Michael and Deb break up at his birthday party, refusing to sleep with her when she intends for this to be his birthday present. Eventually, Lou and Connie cannot control themselves at a bridge party: Lou assaults George, and Connie has a breakdown in front of her friends.

When Michael returns home, he finds his parents arguing and his mother reading his letter; Michael angrily tells his parents the letter actually belongs to him while scolding them for invading his private mail, leaving them in a state of shock. At Deborah's house, Lou confronts Elizabeth about the letter; Deborah Ann overhears him reading the words and tearfully reprimands him, revealing the letter is hers, which leaves Lou in shock. Angered that her parents invaded her privacy, Deborah Ann heads to her room and breaks down into tears.

Later, Michael returns to Toni's house, confessing that nothing happened between him and Deborah and in the process confesses his feelings for Toni and wonders if anything can ever happen between them. However, refusing to admit her feelings after everything that happened, Toni rejects Michael.

Just as the fall semester is about to start, Deborah confronts Michael about the love letters, but upon seeing them, Michael learns they aren't the letters he wrote and realizes that Toni wrote the original love letter (by comparing Debbie's letter to Toni's handwriting). He races to her home, but is told that she left on a study abroad program aboard a ship that will keep her away for her Senior Year. Michael rushes to the dockyard after a brief scuffle with Steve, screaming his love for Toni. After shouting her love for him as the ship continues to sail away, he dives into the water, but cannot reach the ship. Toni dives into the water, too. The lovers embrace in the water and kiss.

Cast 
 C. Thomas Howell as Michael Ryan
 Kelly Preston as Deborah Ann Fimple
 Lori Loughlin as Toni Williams
 Fred Ward as Lieutenant Lou Fimple
 Dee Wallace Stone as Connie Ryan
 Cliff DeYoung as George Ryan
 Leigh Taylor-Young as Elizabeth Fimple
 Casey Siemaszko as Roger Despard
 Geoffrey Blake as Ricardo
 Scott McGinnis as Steve Powers
 Corey Haim as Jeff Ryan
 Courtney Gains as Doug
 J.J. Cohen as Barry
 Janet Carroll as Toni's Mother

Reception 
Rotten Tomatoes, a review aggregator, reports that 30% of 10 surveyed critics gave the film a positive review; the average rating was 4.3/10. In a negative review, Janet Maslin of The New York Times wrote that the initial concept might have sounded good. Maslin called Fred Ward the film's "sole ray of sunshine". Time Out London compared it negatively to French sex farces and said that it offers no insights. TV Guide rated it 1/5 stars and wrote, "This cross between theatrical farce and teen sex comedy is a moronic package that liberally insults the intelligence of both its viewing audience and the hapless adult actors locked into career low points." Reviewing the film retrospectively, Sarah D. Bunting of Slant Magazine called it "relatively good", which she defines as "not unwatchable" in terms of teen films.

In 1985, the Los Angeles Times asked a group of teens to judge their interest in a series of released films. After seeing preview and press materials, the teens rated Secret Admirer "C" on an "A to F" range; their opinion was divided over whether they wanted to see it or not.

Vasos de papel plagiarism controversy
In 2016, the Puerto Rican film Vasos de papel (literal translation: Paper Cups) was object of criticism, and mockery, after it was discovered that the film, produced and directed by Eduardo "Transfor" Ortiz, was an unauthorized, almost-exact copy of Secret Admirer. The film had been playing on 25 screens at local cinemas for less than a week when Puerto Rican film critic Orlando Maldonado wrote an article comparing four sequences from each of the films, and pointing out how they were carbon copies of each other.

Once the film was no longer in cinemas across Puerto Rico, Ortiz, who had previously attributed the writing of the film's screenplay only to himself, first said that there were only "certain similarities between one film and the other, not plagiarism. Everything is a matter of interpretation". A few hours after making that statement, Ortiz changed it, saying in a radio interview that he "had done something terribly wrong", apologizing to his cast and crew. Ortiz refused to comment on the issue until singer-songwriter and the film's lead actress, Natalia Lugo, released a statement on her Facebook page where she both condemned the film, which was her acting debut, and expressed the embarrassment she felt when she saw Secret Admirer, and came to understand how she and her fellow actors and crew had been duped.

References

External links 
 
 
 
 
 

1985 films
1985 directorial debut films
1985 romantic comedy films
1980s sex comedy films
1980s teen comedy films
1980s teen romance films
American sex comedy films
American teen comedy films
American teen romance films
1980s English-language films
Films shot in California
Orion Pictures films
Teen sex comedy films
1980s American films